The county of North Yorkshire is divided into 11 districts. The districts of North Yorkshire are Selby, Harrogate, Craven, Richmondshire, Hambleton, Ryedale, Scarborough, Redcar and Cleveland, Middlesbrough, part of Stockton-on-Tees and City of York.

As there are 364 Grade I listed buildings in the county they have been split into separate lists for each district.

 Grade I listed buildings in Selby (district)
 Grade I listed buildings in Harrogate (borough)
 Grade I listed buildings in Craven
 Grade I listed buildings in Richmondshire
 Grade I listed buildings in Hambleton
 Grade I listed buildings in Ryedale
 Grade I listed buildings in Scarborough (borough)
 Grade I listed buildings in the City of York
 Grade I listed buildings in Redcar and Cleveland
 Grade I listed buildings in Middlesbrough (borough)
 Church of St Peter in Hilton, North Yorkshire (other Grade I listed buildings in Stockton-on-Tees (borough) are in County Durham)

See also
 Grade II* listed buildings in North Yorkshire

References

 National Heritage List for England